Héctor Francisco Rodríguez Hernández is a Honduran football referee who was a listed international referee for FIFA from 2011 to 2019. He officiates in both the Liga Nacional de Fútbol de Honduras and CONCACAF competitions. He officiated the first leg of the 2015 CONCACAF Champions League Finals between Montreal Impact and América.

References

Honduran football referees
1982 births
Living people
CONCACAF Champions League referees
CONCACAF Gold Cup referees